The 2012–13 Lehigh Mountain Hawks men's basketball team represented Lehigh University during the 2012–13 NCAA Division I men's basketball season. The Mountain Hawks, led by sixth year head coach Brett Reed, played their home games at Stabler Arena and were members of the Patriot League. They finished the season 21–10, 10–4 in Patriot League play to finish in a tie for second play. They advanced to the semifinals of the Patriot League tournament where they lost to Lafayette. They were invited to the 2013 College Basketball Invitational where they lost in the first round to Wyoming.

Roster

Schedule

|-
!colspan=9| Regular season

|-
!colspan=9| 2013 Patriot League men's basketball tournament

|-
!colspan=9| 2013 College Basketball Invitational

References

Lehigh Mountain Hawks men's basketball seasons
Lehigh
Lehigh